Radošovice may refer to places in the Czech Republic:

Radošovice (Benešov District), a municipality and village in the Central Bohemian Region
Radošovice (České Budějovice District), a municipality and village in the South Bohemian Region
Radošovice (Strakonice District), a municipality and village in the South Bohemian Region